Metaphya is a genus of dragonfly in the family Corduliidae. Metaphya are found in Asia, New Guinea, Australia, Indonesia and parts of the Pacific region.

Species
The genus Metaphya includes the following species:

Metaphya elongata 
Metaphya micans 
Metaphya stueberi 
Metaphya tillyardi

References

Corduliidae
Anisoptera genera
Odonata of Asia
Odonata of Oceania
Insects of New Guinea
Insects of Indonesia
Insects of Southeast Asia
Insects of New Caledonia
Taxa named by Frank Fortescue Laidlaw
Insects described in 1912